Miroslav Baranek (born 10 November 1973) is a Czech former professional footballer, who serves as a team manager at Sparta Prague. Besides the Czech Republic, he has played in Germany and Austria.

Honours
Sparta Prague
 Czech First League: 1997–98, 1998–99, 1999–2000, 2002–03, 2004–05; runner-up 2003–04
 Czech Cup: 2003–04

Sigma Olomouc
 Czech First League runner-up: 1995–96

References

External links 
 
 
 

1973 births
Living people
People from Havířov
Association football midfielders
Czech footballers
Czech Republic under-21 international footballers
Czech Republic international footballers
Czech First League players
Bundesliga players
MFK Vítkovice players
SK Sigma Olomouc players
AC Sparta Prague players
1. FC Köln players
FK Mladá Boleslav players
FK Jablonec players
FC Admira Wacker Mödling players
Expatriate footballers in Germany
Sportspeople from the Moravian-Silesian Region